The Kenya Times was an English-language newspaper published in Kenya published from 1983 to 2010.

It was first published on 5 April 1983 and was founded by KANU, at that time the only legal political party in Kenya. The paper was originally known as The Nairobi Times. In 1988, Robert Maxwell, who also published The Mirror, bought a 45% stake in the paper, the remaining ownership was still held by KANU. The paper was subsequently re-branded and it became the first full-colour newspaper in Kenya. It also launched a Swahili-language sister paper, Kenya Leo. Kenya Times briefly overtook The Standard as the second most popular newspaper in Kenya (after Daily Nation), but its popularity waned after 1992's general elections, the first multi-party elections in Kenya since the abolition of one-party-system.

Kenya Times stopped publication in early June 2010 due to financial problems.

References

External links
The Kenya Times Website

Defunct newspapers published in Kenya